Qafë e Vranicës is a mountain pass through the Albanian mountains along the border between Albania and Montenegro. A new border crossing point between the two countries is planned to be open at the pass.

References 

Mountain passes of Albania
Albania–Montenegro border crossings